Getting In, also known as Student Body, is a 1994 American black comedy film directed by Doug Liman starring Andrew McCarthy and Stephen Mailer. It was the feature film debut of Doug Liman.

Despite its considerably famous cast, Indiewire has reported that information about the film is virtually impossible to track down.

Plot
When Rupert Grim learns that there are several students ahead of him in line to be admitted to medical school he devises a plan for them each to meet with a series of unfortunate '"accidents". Gabriel Higgs also is in need to get into the school, considering that every generation ahead of him has been a doctor. He attempts to bribe both Amanda Morel and Randall Burns, but they refuse to be bribed. Instead, both are arrogant and belittle Gabriel. If it wasn't for the hacking skills of his friend Ron, Gabriel wouldn't have made the list at all. Gabriel then attempts to think of away to bribe Kirby Watts, but he falls in love with her instead, though he is rebuffed there as well.

First, Randall Burns meets a grisly end when he attempts to use a shower after getting chemicals on his clothing. Instead, the shower releases a different liquid that engulfs Randall in flames and he burns to death. Amanda Morel meets her demise after eating a morel fungus to which she is allergic. Both Amanda and Randall have met demises similar to their surnames. By now, Gabriel has become the main suspect, though he manages to convince Kirby that he is the killer. Soon, Rupert Grim is able to lure Kirby into a situation that puts her life in danger. Grim announces his grand scheme to murder everyone in front of him on the list and frame Gabriel. Rupert has become a "grim reaper" of sorts. Gabriel is able to save the day and defeat Rupert and save Kirby. With both Burns and Morel dead, Gabriel is able to continue his family’s legacy by marrying Kirby as she is excepted into the school, carry on his last name for the family. Gabriel becomes a ecology professor and Rupert's dead body is donated to Kirby’s class for science.

Cast
 Stephen Mailer as Gabriel Higgs
 Andrew McCarthy as Rupert Grimm
 Kristy Swanson as Kirby Watts
 Calista Flockhart as Amanda Morel
 Matthew Perry as Randall Burns
 Dave Chappelle as Ron
 Christine Baranski as Mrs. Margaret 'Maggie' Higgs
 Len Cariou as Dr. Lionel Higgs / Dr. Ezekiel Higgs
 Joanne Pankow as Nurse
 Sean Bridgers as the Dumpster Hunter
 Christina Keefe as Rachel

Reception
The film reportedly underperformed at the box office in 1994.

Film critic, Dragan Antulov, criticized the film, calling it a "series of predictable clichéd situations and jokes that would hardly make anyone laugh. [...] The only memorable performance is given by Andrew McCarthy who obviously has a lot of fun playing psychopath."

References

External links
 
 
 

1994 films
1994 comedy films
1990s black comedy films
American black comedy films
Films about higher education
Films about murder
Films directed by Doug Liman
Films scored by Alex Wurman
Films shot in North Carolina
1994 directorial debut films
1990s English-language films
1990s American films